Frederick Thomas Elworthy (1830–1907) was an English philologist and antiquary.

Life
He was the eldest son of Thomas Elworthy, woollen manufacturer, of Wellington, Somerset, and his wife Jane, daughter of William Chorley of Quarm, near Dunster.
He was born at Wellington on 10 January 1830, and was educated at a private school at Denmark Hill. 
Though studious from boyhood, he did not enter on authorship until middle life.

He became eminent first as a philologist and later as a writer on folk-lore. 
His two books on the evil eye and kindred superstitions contain much curious information gathered during travels in Spain, Italy, and other countries, in the course of which he made perhaps the finest collection of charms, amulets, and such-like trinkets in existence; this collection was in the possession of his widow until her death, and was then bequeathed to the Somersetshire Archæological Society's museum at Taunton. 
He contributed to Archæologia, was the council of the Philological Society, and in 1891-6 was editorial secretary of the Somersetshire Archæological Society, for whose Proceedings, as well as for those of the Devonshire Association, he wrote some valuable papers.

He was elected F.S.A. on 14 June 1900. 
He was a good linguist and possessed considerable skill as a draughtsman and as an artist in water-colours. He was a prominent churchman, and the erection of All Saints' Church, Wellington, was largely due to his liberality and exertions. 
He was a magistrate, a churchwarden, an active member of the Wellington school board, and a prominent freemason.

After an illness which began in the summer of 1906 he died at his residence, Foxdown, Wellington, on 13 December 1907, and was buried in the churchyard of the parish church there.

Works
1875: The Dialect of West Somerset (The dialect of West Somerset. - An outline of the grammar of the dialect of West Somerset. - West Somerset word-book.) 2 vols. London: Trübner for the English Dialect Society, 1875-1886
1895: The Evil Eye : an account of this ancient and widespread superstition. London: John Murray
1900: Horns of Honour: and other studies in the by-ways of archeology. London: John Murray

Notes

References

External links

 
Alison Petch, Frederick Thomas Elworthy 'The Other Within' project. Pitt Rivers Museum.
Works on Open Library

1830 births
1907 deaths
English folklorists
Fellows of the Society of Antiquaries of London
English philologists